Buttiauxella brennerae  is a bacterium from the genus of Buttiauxella which has been isolated from a snail in Braunschweig in Germany.Buttiauxella brennerae is named after the American microbiologist W. Hickmann-Brenner.

References

Further reading 
 
	

Enterobacteriaceae
Bacteria described in 1996